Frederick John Rennie Whittaker (April 18, 1923 – September 29, 2006) was a lacrosse and soccer player from British Columbia, Canada. He was signed by the English club Notts County in 1946 and scored two goals in ten games for them in that year. Back in Canada he led Vancouver North Shore United to the national championship in 1949 and played eleven times for and coached the British Columbia All-Stars.

In 2002, he was inducted into the Canada Soccer Hall of Fame.

References

External links
 / Canada Soccer Hall of Fame

1923 births
2006 deaths
Soccer players from Vancouver
Canadian lacrosse players
Canadian soccer players
Association football forwards
Vancouver North Shore United players
Notts County F.C. players
English Football League players
Canada Soccer Hall of Fame inductees
Canadian expatriate soccer players
Canadian expatriate sportspeople in England